Georgi Stoyanov may refer to:

 Georgi Stoyanov (footballer), a Bulgarian footballer
 Georgi Stoyanov (pentathlete), a Bulgarian modern pentathlete